Marco Ludivin Majouga (born 9 May 2001) is a French professional footballer who plays as a winger for the Bulgarian club Botev Vratsa in the First League.

Career
Majouga is a youth product of Toulouse-Montaudran, Toulouse and Nîmes. He made his professional debut with Nîmes in a 1–1 Ligue 1 tie with RC Lens on 27 September 2020. On 31 August 2021, he transferred to Dunkerque signing a 2-year contract. On 7 February 2023, he transferred to the Bulgarian club Botev Vratsa.

References

External links
 
 FFF Profile

2001 births
Living people
Footballers from Toulouse
French footballers
French sportspeople of Central African Republic descent
Association football wingers
Nîmes Olympique players
USL Dunkerque players
Ligue 1 players
Ligue 2 players
Championnat National 2 players
Championnat National 3 players